The Paramount Plaza Walk of Fame honors artists who recorded for Paramount Records in Grafton, Wisconsin with a 'piano key'.

Annually, additional keys - placed by the Village of Grafton - will be inscribed with the names of artists who recorded for Paramount Records.

Starting in 2006, the first inductees chosen by the Paramount GIG ('Grooves In Grafton') organization, in Grafton, were Charley Patton, Ma Rainey, Blind Lemon Jefferson, Skip James, Thomas Dorsey, and Henry Townsend.

External links
Paramount Plaza Walk of Fame

Walks of fame
Halls of fame in Wisconsin
Paramount Records
Tourist attractions in Ozaukee County, Wisconsin
Awards established in 2006
Music halls of fame